A bestiary is a compendium of beasts.

Bestiary may also refer to:

 Bestiary (Robert Rich album), 2001 
 Bestiary (Hail Mary Mallon album), 2014
 Bestiary!, a 1985 anthology of fantasy short stories
 Bestiary, a 2020 novel by K-Ming Chang